"You Are Not Alone" is Modern Talking's first single released off their eighth album Alone. It was released in Germany and in other European Territories on February 1, 1999.

Background
In Germany, the single peaked at No. 7 on March 8, 1999, over a month after its release date. "You Are Not Alone" spent five weeks within the German single chart and total of 15 weeks on the top-100, it eventually reached a gold status for shipping over 250,000 in Germany alone.

While, "You Are Not Alone" entered the top-20 in Switzerland, France, Sweden, it managed to enter the top-10 in Finland and the top-5 in Austria and Norway.

Single release 
CD-Maxi Hansa 74321 63800 2 (BMG) / EAN 0743216380022	01.02.1999

Charts

Weekly charts

Year-end charts

References

External links

1999 singles
Modern Talking songs
Songs written by Dieter Bohlen
1999 songs
Ariola Records singles